The Intermediate League World Series Central Region is one of five United States regions that currently sends teams to the World Series in Livermore, California. The region's participation in the ILWS dates back to 2013.

Central Region States

Region Champions
As of the 2022 Intermediate League World Series.

Results by State
As of the 2022 Intermediate League World Series.

See also
Central Region in other Little League divisions
Little League – Central 1957-2000
Little League – Great Lakes
Little League – Midwest
Junior League
Senior League
Big League

References

Central
Intermediate League World Series
Baseball competitions in the United States
Sports in the Midwestern United States